Evan Lynn Schwab is an American attorney who served as law clerk to Justice William O. Douglas of the Supreme Court of the United States during the 1963 Term.

Biography
Schwab graduated from the University of Washington with a B.A. in 1961. He received a LL.B. with Order of the Coif honors in 1963 from the University of Washington School of Law, where he was the Comment Editor of the Washington Law Review. Following graduation, he clerked for Justice Douglas in Washington, D.C. Returning to Seattle in 1964, he entered private practice at Bogle & Gates, and after its collapse became a partner at Dorsey & Whitney. Among his notable cases is representing Wendy McCaw in 1997 in her divorce from cell phone magnate, Craig McCaw. In 1967, Schwab argued the case of Mempa v. Rhay before the U.S. Supreme Court, winning a unanimous opinion written by Justice Thurgood Marshall that a revocation of parole proceeding triggers the right to counsel. In 1971, Schwab served as Special Deputy Prosecuting Attorney for the King County Grand Jury Investigation of police payoffs led by Prosecutor Chris Bayley and Judge Stanley C. Soderland.

See also 
 List of law clerks of the Supreme Court of the United States (Seat 4)

References

1938 births
Living people
University of Washington alumni
University of Washington School of Law alumni
Law clerks of the Supreme Court of the United States
20th-century American lawyers
Lawyers from Seattle
United States Marines